The politics of Nepal functions within the framework of a parliamentary republic with a multi-party system. Executive power is exercised by the Prime Minister and their cabinet, while legislative power is vested in the Parliament.

The Governing Nepali Congress and Communist Party of Nepal (UML) have been the main rivals of each other since the early 1990s, with each party defeating the other in successive elections. There are seven major political parties in the federal parliament: Nepali Congress (NC), CPN (UML), CPN (Maoist-centre), CPN (Unified Socialist), People's Socialist Party, Nepal, Loktantrik Samajwadi Party, Nepal and People's Progressive Party. While all major parties officially espouse democratic socialism, UML, Unified Socialist and Maoist-centre are considered leftist while the Nepali Congress, Democratic Socialist Party and People's Progressive Party are considered centrist, with most considering them center-left and some center-right. The party PSP-N is center-left to left-wing. During most of the brief periods of democratic exercise in the 1950s and 1990s, Nepali Congress held a majority in parliament. After a ten-year civil war, the Nepalese parliament voted to abolish the monarchy in June 2006, and Nepal became a federal republic on 28 May 2008. A new constitution was adopted in 2015, and in 2017 Nepal held its first general election since the end of the civil war, in which the Nepal Communist Party (a short-lived merger of the UML and Maoist-centre) won a majority at the federal level as well as in six of the seven provinces.

 while the 2018 Polity data series considers it to be a democracy.

History

Family politics

The four noble families to be involved in the active politics of the Kingdom of Nepal before the rise of the Rana dynasty were the Shah dynasty, the Basnyat family, the Pande dynasty and the Thapa dynasty. At the end of 18th century, the Thapas and the Pandes had extreme dominance over Nepalese Darbar politics, alternatively contesting for central power with one another. Early politics in the Kingdom of Nepal was characterised by factionalism, conspiracies and murders, including two major massacres. After almost a century of power-wrangling among the Basnyat, Pande and Thapa families, the military leader Bir Narsingh Kunwar emerged on top in the aftermath of the Kot massacre, and established the Rana dynasty in 1846, which consolidated powers of the king and prime minister and would reign for another century with a policy of oppression and isolationism.

Post 1950s

By the 1930s, Nepali expatriates in India had started smuggling in writings on political philosophies, which gave birth to a vibrant underground political movement in the capital, birthing Nepal Praja Parishad in 1939, which was dissolved only two years later, following the execution of the four great martyrs. Around the same time, Nepalis involved in the Indian Independence Movement started organising into political parties, leading to the birth of Nepali Congress and Communist Party of Nepal. Following Indian independence, Nepali Congress was successful in overthrowing the Rana regime with support from the Indian government and cooperation from the king. While communism was still trying to find its footing, Nepali Congress enjoyed overwhelming support of the electorate. Following a brief ten-year exercise in democracy, the autocratic Panchayat system was initiated, this time by the King, who deposed the democratically elected government of Nepali Congress, imprisoned or exiled prominent leaders and issued a ban on party politics.

Many political parties and their leaders remained underground or in exile for the next 30 years of "partyless" politics in Nepal. BP Koirala was released from prison in 1968 and went into exile in Benaras, returning in 1976 only to immediately be put in house arrest. Although an armed insurgency launched by the major communist faction called the Jhapa movement had failed comprehensively by 1971, it formed the foundation for the dominant communist power, CPN (ML), that was officially launched in 1978. A general referendum was held in 1980, which saw the CPN ML campaign for the option of multi-party democracy, along with Nepali Congress, but the Panchayat System was declared the winner to significant controversy. The Panchayat rule saw governments led by a group of monarchy loyalists taking turns, with Surya Bahadur Thapa, Tulsi Giri and Kirti Nidhi Bista becoming prime minister three times each, among others. It introduced a number of reforms, built infrastructures and modernised the country, while significantly curtailing political freedom, imposing the Nepali language and Khas culture to the oppression of all others, and spreading Indophobic propaganda, the effects of which are experienced to the present day.

In 1990, the joint civil resistance launched by the United Left front and Nepali Congress was successful in overthrowing the Panchayat, and the country became a constitutional monarchy. The United Left Front became CPN UML. The Panchayat loyalists formed National Democratic Party, which emerged as the third major party. While Nepali Congress ran the government for most of the next ten years of democracy that followed, democracy was mostly a disappointment owing to the immature democratic culture and political infighting in the capital, as well as the civil war that followed the guerrilla insurgency launched by the Maoist Party. Following a four-year autocratic rule by King Gyanendra that failed to defeat the Maoists, a mass civil protest was launched by a coalition of the Maoists and the political parties in 2006, which forced the king to stepped down, brought the Maoists to the peace process, and established a democratic republic by 2008.

Following the political consensus to draft the new constitution of the Republic via a constituent assembly, Nepali politics saw a rise of nationalist groups and ideologies. While the political power-wrangling caused continuous instability, maintaining the established average of nine months per government, this period saw two constituent assembly elections and the rise of Madhesi nationalist parties, especially in the Eastern Terai region. By 2015, the new constitution had been promulgated and Nepal became "a federal democratic republic striving towards democratic socialism". In 2017, a series of elections were held according to the new constitution, which established Nepal Communist Party (NCP) (formally united after the election) as the ruling party at the federal level as well as six of the seven provinces, Nepali Congress as the only significant opposition in federal and provincial levels, while the Madhesi coalition formed the provincial government in Province No. 2, but boasts negligible presence in the rest of the country.

Political parties 
The political parties in Nepal can be mainly divided into the Democratic camp and the Communist camp. Still, these parties at times form alliances with each other and among them as per the situation and demand.

Democratic camp 
This camp is led by Nepali Congress, the opposition party in Nepal. Numerous parties in Nepal claim to endorse democratic ideology but few are active which are listed below.

Communist camp 

Majorly, CPN(UML) and CPN(Maoist Centre) carry the communist legacy in Nepal while there are other few parties which claim to endorse communist ideology. Some of them are given below. They currently make up the ruling coalition.

Political conditions

2001: Royal massacre

The Royal Massacre (राजदरबार हत्याकाण्ड) happened
on 1 June 2001, in which members of the royal family, King Birendra, Queen Aishwarya, Crown Prince Dipendra, Prince Nirajan, as well as many others, were killed. However, after the massacre, the Crown Prince survived for a short while in a coma.

Although the prince never regained consciousness before dying, Crown Prince Dipendra was the monarch under the law of Nepali royal succession. Two days later after his death, the late King's surviving brother Gyanendra was proclaimed as a king.

2002–2007: Suspension of parliament and Loktantra Andolan

On 22 May 2002 King Gyanendra suspended the Parliament, appointed a government led by himself, and enforced martial law. The King argued that civil politicians were unfit to handle the Maoist insurgency. Telephone lines were cut and several high-profile political leaders were detained. Other opposition leaders fled to India and regrouped there. A broad coalition called the Seven Party Alliance (SPA) was formed in opposition to the royal takeover, encompassing the seven parliamentary parties who held about 90% of the seats in the old, dissolved parliament.

The Office of the United Nations High Commissioner for Human Rights, in response to events in Nepal, set up a monitoring program in 2005 to assess and observe the human rights situation there.

On 22 November 2005, the Seven Party Alliance (SPA) of parliamentary parties and the Communist Party of Nepal (Maoist) agreed on a historic and unprecedented 12-point memorandum of understanding (MOU) for peace and democracy. Nepali people from various walks of life and the international community regarded the MOU as an appropriate political response to the crisis that was developing in Nepal. Against the backdrop of the historical sufferings of the Nepali people and the enormous human cost of the last ten years of violent conflict, the MOU, which proposes a peaceful transition through an elected constituent assembly, created an acceptable formula for a united movement for democracy. As per the 12-point MOU, the SPA called for a protest movement, and the Communist Party of Nepal (Maoist) supported it. This led to a countrywide uprising called the Loktantra Andolan that started in April 2006. All political forces including civil society and professional organisations actively galvanised the people. This resulted in massive and spontaneous demonstrations and rallies held across Nepal against King Gyanendra's autocratic rule.

On 21 April 2006, King Gyanendra declared that "power would be returned to the people". This had little effect on the people, who continued to occupy the streets of Kathmandu and other towns, openly defying the daytime curfew. Finally, King Gyanendra announced the reinstatement of the House of Representatives, thereby conceding one of the major demands of the SPA, at midnight on 24 April 2006. Following this action, the coalition of political forces decided to call off the protests.

At least 14 died during the 19 days of protests.

On 19 May 2006, the parliament assumed total legislative power and gave executive power to the Government of Nepal (previously known as His Majesty's Government). Names of many institutions (including the army) were stripped of the "royal" adjective and the Raj Parishad (a council of the King's advisers) was abolished, with his duties assigned to the Parliament itself. The activities of the King became subject to parliamentary scrutiny and the King's properties were subjected to taxation. Moreover, Nepal was declared a secular state abrogating the previous status of a Hindu Kingdom. However, most of the changes have, as yet, not been implemented.  On 19 July 2006, the prime minister, G. P. Koirala, sent a letter to the United Nations announcing the intention of the Nepali government to hold elections to a constituent assembly by April 2007.

December 2007 to May 2008: Abolition of the monarchy
On 23 December 2007, an agreement was made for the monarchy to be abolished and the country to become a federal republic with the Prime Minister becoming head of state. The Communist Party of Nepal (Maoist) became the largest party amidst a general atmosphere of fear and intimidation from all sides. A federal republic was established in May 2008, with only four members of the 601-seat Constituent Assembly voting against the change, which ended 240 years of royal rule in Nepal. The government announced a public holiday for three days, (28 – 30 May), to celebrate the country becoming a federal republic.

Since 2008 

Major parties such as the Unified Communist Party of Nepal (Maoist), Communist Party of Nepal (Unified Marxist-Leninist) (CPN UML) and the Nepali Congress agreed to write a constitution to replace the interim constitution within 2 years.

The Maoists, as the largest party of the country, took power right after the elections and named Pushpa Kamal Dahal (Prachanda) as the Prime Minister of Nepal. CPN UML also joined this government, but the Nepali Congress took the part of the main opposition party. Prachanda soon fell into a dispute with the then army chief Rookmanda Katwal and decided to sack him. But the President Ram Baran Yadav, as the supreme head of
military power in the country, revoked this decision and gave the army chief additional time in office. An angry Prachanda and his party quit the government, majorly citing this reason and decided to operate as the main opposition to the government headed by CPN UML and its co-partner Nepali Congress afterward. Madhav Kumar Nepal was named the Prime Minister.

The Maoists demanded civilian supremacy over the army.

The Maoists forced closures – commonly known as bandhs – in the country, and also declared autonomous states for almost all the ethnic groups in Nepal.

In May 2012 the constitutional assembly was dissolved and another election to select the new constitutional assembly members were declared by Dr. Baburam Bhattarai.

Madhes Movement (2007–2016) 
The Madhes Movement (Nepali: मधेस अान्दोलन) is a political movement launched by various political parties, especially those based in Madhes, for equal rights, dignity and identity of Madhesis and Tharus, Muslims and Janjati groups in Nepal. In nearly a decade, Nepal witnessed three Madhes Movements - the first Madhes Movement erupted in 2007, the second Madhes Movement in 2008 and the third Madhes Movement in 2015. About the origin of the first Madhes Movement, Journalist Amarendra Yadav writes in The Rising Nepal "When the then seven-party alliance of the mainstream political parties and the CPN-Maoist jointly announced the Interim Constitution in 2007, it totally ignored the concept of federalism, the most desired political agenda of Madhesis and other marginalised communities. A day after the promulgation of the interim statute, a group of Madhesi activists under the Upendra Yadav-led Madhesi Janaadhikar Forum-Nepal (then a socio-intellectual NGO) burnt copies of the interim constitution at Maitighar Mandala, Kathmandu." This triggered the Madhes movement I.

The second Madhes Movement took place in 2008, jointly launched by Madhesi Janaadhikar Forum-Nepal, Terai Madhes Loktantrik Party and Sadbhawana Party led by Rajendra Mahato with three key agenda: federalism, proportional representation and population-based election constituency, which were later ensured in the Interim Constitution of Nepal 2008.

However, The Constitution of Nepal 2015 backtracked from those issues, that were already ensured by the Interim Constitution of Nepal 2008. Supreme Court of Nepal Advocate Dipendra Jha writes in The Kathmandu Post: "many other aspects of the new constitution are more regressive than the Interim Constitution of Nepal 2007. Out of all its deficiencies, the most notable one concerns the issue proportional representation or inclusion in all organs of the state." This triggered the third Madhes Movement by Madhesis in Nepal. Although the first amendment to the constitution was done, the resistance over the document by Madhesi and Tharus in Nepal still continues.

From 2017 to 2019 

In June 2017, Nepali Congress leader Sher Bahadur Deuba was elected the 40th Prime Minister of Nepal, succeeding  Prime Minister and Chairman of CPN (Maoist Centre) Pushpa Kamal Dahal.  Deuba had been previously Prime Minister from 1995 to 1997, from 2001 to 2002, and from 2004 to 2005.

In November 2017, Nepal had its first general election since the civil war ended and the monarchy was abolished. The main alternatives were centrist Nepali Congress Party and the alliance of former Maoist rebels and the Communist UML party. The alliance of communists won the election, and UML leader Khadga Prasad Sharma Oli was sworn in February 2018 as the new Prime Minister. He had previously been Prime Minister since 2015 until 2016.

Political crisis 2020 

Since the inception of NCP, the struggle for power between the two leaders: Khadga Prasad Sharma Oli and Pushpa Kamal Dahal started. The internal crisis led to dissolution of parliament (both house of representative and lower house of parliament) by Khadga Prasad Oli twice within six months. It was approved by the president but Supreme court denied the legality of such decision by Oli. After the supreme court's historic decision, both the parliaments were reinstated.

After facing the vote for confidence in parliament, Oli lost the vote for confidence. As per the 72(6) of Constitution of Nepal, the opposition was given the opportunity to form a new government by President Bidya Devi Bhandari. The opposition and they could not construct the new government as they lacked support of one faction from Janata Samajbadi Party. As a result, the party got divide and Loktantrik Samajwadi Party, Nepal was formed after nearly a month.

As a result, Khadga Prasad Oli was sworn in again as the Prime minister of Nepal. He dissolved the parliament on 22 May 2021 for second time rather than taking vote of confidence. This time as well, it was approved by president unanimously against the signatures submitted claiming majority to NC. Still, 146 of the total 275 sitting members of HOR filed a case in supreme court against the decision and approval of president. Previously, they had submitted majority signatures to president asking to appoint Sher Bahadur Deuba as the next Prime minister of Nepal.

On 4 June 2021, a major cabinet re-shuffle took place when so called Madhesbani leader Rajendra Mahato led faction of PSP-N joined the government with eight cabinet ministers and two state ministers while other five from CPN (UML). Bishnu Prasad Paudel, Raghubir Mahasheth and Rajendra Mahato were made Deputy Prime-minister. While the previous expansion was yet to be clarified by the Supreme Court, Oli made yet another re-shuffle and included seven ministers from UML and one from PSP-N. On 22 June, Supreme Court delivered a fresh blow to embattled Prime Minister KP Sharma Oli 20 removing recently appointed ministers. It revealed a care-taker prime-minister cannot make such change as per article 77(3) of Constitution of Nepal.  By the end, only five ministers are present in Council of ministers including sitting PM Oli while deputy prime minister post of Bishnu Prasad Paudel was removed.

Present (2021–) 

On 12 July 2021, the Supreme Court stated the decision to dissolve parliament was unlawful. Similarly, it ordered the appointment Deuba as the next Prime Minister of Nepal citing article 76(5) of the Constitution of Nepal within 28 hours. It stated that the decision made by the president was against the norms of the constitution. This was celebrated by the then opposition alliance led by the Nepali Congress including allies CPN (Maoist-Centre) and the Janata Samajbadi Party. On 13 July 2021, President Bidya Devi Bhandari appointed Sher Bahadur Deuba as the Prime Minister without including any article of Constitution and stating as per the order of Court. This created cold dispute and people alleged President Bhandari of forgetting her limits and being tilted to ex-PM Oli. After Deuba declined to take the oath as per the appointment letter, the letter was changed and stated that Deuba was made PM in accordance with article 76(5), marking Deuba's fifth term as PM. On 13 July 2021, Sher Bahadur Deuba was sworn in as Nepal’s prime minister for fifth time.

Legislative branch

Present
In 2022, the Parliament (Sansad) has two chambers. The House of Representatives (Pratinidhi Sabha) has 275 members elected for five-year term in single-seat constituencies. The National Council (Rashtriya Sabha) has 59 members, 8 from each state and the remaining 3 from the private concern of the government.

From the 2006 democratic  movement to the Constituent Assembly
After the victory of the democratic movement in the spring of 2006, a unicameral interim legislature replaced the previous parliament. The new body consists both of members of the old parliament as well as nominated members. As of December 2007, the legislature had the following composition.

The first elections after becoming a Republic: the Constituent Assembly
In May 2008 the elections for the Constituent Assembly saw the Communist Party of Nepal as the largest party in the Constituent Assembly, which will have a term of two years.

Judicial branch
The judiciary is composed of the Supreme Court (सर्बोच्च अदालत), Appellate courts, and various District courts. The Chief Justice of the Supreme Court was appointed by the monarch on the recommendation of the Constitutional Council; the other judges were appointed by the monarch on the recommendation of the Judicial Council.

Nepal's judiciary is legally separate from the executive and legislative and has increasingly shown the will to be independent of political influence. The judiciary has the right of judicial review under the constitution.

Different levels of governments

Federal government 

The executive is headed by prime minister while president remains head of state. Nepal has provision for executive Prime minister per the present Constitution of Nepal. The role of President is largely ceremonial as the functioning of the government is managed entirely by the Prime Minister who is appointed by the Parliament.

Provincial government 

As per the Constitution of Nepal, there are 7 provinces in Nepal with their own provincial government and assemblies.

Municipal/Local government 

The district assembly is governed by the District Coordination Committee.

International organisation participation of Nepal
AsDB, MINA, CCC, Colombo Plan, ESCAP, FAO, Group of 77, IBRD, ICAO, ICFTU, ICRM, International Development Association, IFAD, International Finance Corporation, IFRCS, International Labour Organization, International Monetary Fund, International Maritime Organization, Intelsat, Interpol, IOC, IOM, International Organization for Standardization (correspondent), ITU, MONUC, Non-Aligned Movement, OPCW, SAARC, United Nations, UNCTAD, UNDP, UNESCO, UNIDO, UNIFIL, UNMIBH, UNMIK, UNMOP, UNMOT, UNTAET, UPU, World Federation of Trade Unions, WHO, WIPO, WMO, WToO, WTrO CPC Nepal (applicant)

Notes

References

Further reading
 Devendra, Jonathan (2013).  Massacre at the Palace: The Doomed Royal Dynasty of Nepal.  New York: Hyperion.  .

External links
 The Interim Constitution of Nepal, 2063 (2007)
 The Constitution of The Kingdom of Nepal, 2047 (1990) (terminated by the Interim Constitution)